Egyptair Cargo is the cargo division of the Egyptian national airline Egyptair. It operates using both its own dedicated aircraft and the cargo-carrying capacity of its sister passenger airline. Its main base is Cairo International Airport.

History

Egyptair Cargo was formed in 2002 from the existing cargo activities of Egyptair, on the creation of The Egyptair Holding Company, as one of its subsidiaries. The company is a member of IATA's Cargo 2000 initiative.

In 2008 the airline introduced a modified logo with larger Egyptair Cargo titles, however sister company Egyptair introduced a new livery and logo later that year that has been applied to the cargo fleet as well.

Corporate affairs

Ownership and structure
Egyptair Cargo is a wholly owned subsidiary of Egyptair Holding Company, a state-owned company, 100% owned by the Government of Egypt.

Business trends
Trends for recent years for Egyptair Cargo are shown below (for years ending 30 June):

Destinations
As of November 2021, Egyptair Cargo operates flights to:

Fleet

Current fleet

 the Egyptair Cargo fleet consists of the following aircraft:

Retired Fleet

References

External links

EgyptAir
Airlines of Egypt
Airlines established in 2002
Cargo airlines
Egyptian companies established in 2002